Uganda was represented at the 2006 Commonwealth Games in Melbourne by a 12-member strong contingent comprising 6 sportspersons and 6 officials.

Medals

Gold
 Dorcus Inzikuru, Athletics, Women's 3000m Steeplechase
 Boniface Kiprop Toroitich, Athletics, Men's 10000m

Silver

Bronze
 Martin Mubiru, Boxing, Flyweight 51 kg

Uganda at the Commonwealth Games
Nations at the 2006 Commonwealth Games
Commonwealth Games